The Wilmington and Manchester Railroad was a railroad that served South Carolina and North Carolina before, during and after the American Civil War. It received its charter in 1846 and began operation in 1853 from Wilmington, North Carolina, extending west to the now-defunct town of Manchester, South Carolina (just west of Sumter).

Route
The  route was built to haul South Carolina cotton to the Port of Wilmington, which was attempting to compete with the Port of Charleston. The railroad would go on to become a major shipper of naval stores and cotton.

History

American Civil War
The line was devastated at the end of the war, when Union Gen. William T. Sherman dispatched some 2,500 federal troops from the South Carolina coast to locate locomotives and rolling stock that the Confederates were hiding in the state's hinterland. In April 1865, the force, under Gen. Edward E. Potter located nine locomotives and approximately 200 cars, many belonging to the Wilmington and Manchester, near Manchester, SC, and destroyed them.

Bankruptcy
Gen. William MacRae took over as superintendent in January 1866 and helped get the line back in operating order. However, the Wilmington and Manchester declared bankruptcy in 1870. The railroad was reorganized as the short-lived Wilmington and Carolina Railroad and again as the Wilmington, Columbia and Augusta Railroad.

Later Years
The line was formally merged with the Atlantic Coast Line Railroad (ACL) in 1898.  The line from Florence to the junction with the Fayetteville Cutoff became part of the Atlantic Coast Line's main line.

The Atlantic Coast Line became the Seaboard Coast Line Railroad in 1967 after merging with their former rival, the Seaboard Air Line Railroad.  In 1980, the Seaboard Coast Line's parent company merged with the Chessie System, creating the CSX Corporation.  The CSX Corporation initially operated the Chessie and Seaboard Systems separately until 1986, when they were merged into CSX Transportation. 

CSX still operates the former ACL main line segment (which is now the CSX's A Line).  The line from Mullins to Whiteville is now operated by the R.J. Corman Railroad Group

Station Listing

Notes

References

Defunct South Carolina railroads
Defunct North Carolina railroads
Railway companies established in 1846
Railway companies disestablished in 1870
5 ft gauge railways in the United States
1846 establishments in North Carolina
American companies established in 1846